V. tricolor may refer to:
 Vanda tricolor, an orchid species found in Laos and from Java to Bali
 Vanellus tricolor, the banded lapwing, a wader species found over most of Australia and Tasmania
 Vexillum tricolor, a small sea snail species
 Viola tricolor, a plant species native to Europe

See also
 Tricolor (disambiguation)